The Treasurer of the Australian Capital Territory is the title held by the Cabinet Minister who is responsible for the management of the Government of the Australian Capital Territory's public sector finances, and for preparing and delivering the annual Territory Budget.

The current ACT Treasurer is Andrew Barr.

List of treasurers of the Australian Capital Territory

References

External links
 ACT Department of Treasury
 ACT Budget Papers
 ACT Government homepage

Australian Capital Territory-related lists
 
Australian Capital Territory